Elihu Thomson (March 29, 1853 – March 13, 1937) was an English-born American engineer and inventor who was instrumental in the founding of major electrical companies in the United States, the United Kingdom and France.

Early life
He was born in Manchester, England, on March 29, 1853, but his family moved to Philadelphia in the United States in 1858. Thomson attended Central High School in Philadelphia and graduated in 1870. Thomson took a teaching position at Central, and in 1876, at the age of twenty-three, held the chair of Chemistry. In 1880, he left Central to pursue research in the emerging field of electrical engineering.

Electrical innovations
With Edwin J. Houston, a former teacher and later colleague of Thomson's at Central High School, Thomson founded the Thomson-Houston Electric Company. Notable inventions created by Thomson during this period include an arc-lighting system, an automatically regulated three-coil dynamo, a magnetic lightning arrester, and a local power transformer. In 1892 the Thomson-Houston Electric Company merged with the Edison General Electric Company to become the General Electric Company.

The historian Thomas P. Hughes writes that Thomson "displayed methodological characteristics in the workshop and the laboratory as [an] inventor and in the business world as [an] entrepreneur. He also chose to solve problems in the rapidly expanding field of electric light and power." Thomson's name is further commemorated by the British Thomson-Houston Company (BTH), and the French companies Thomson SA (now Technicolor SA) and Alstom (formerly Alsthom).

Thomson was notable both for his emphasis on models and for the singular focus with which he pursued his research, with Thomson referring to his workshop as a "model room" rather than a laboratory. Between 1880 and 1885, Thomson averaged twenty-one patent applications annually, doubling that average between 1885 and 1890.

Upon the merger of Thomson-Houston Electric Company (his namesake company) to form General Electric in 1892, Thomson chose to keep his laboratory at Lynn, Massachusetts near Boston away from GE's New York headquarters to ensure his control over his research. At the Lynn GE plant, he worked with Edwin Rice (later President of GE in 1913) and Sanford Moss and Charles Steinmetz (who was located at GE headquarters in Schenectady, New York). After being asked to become a director of GE, Thomson rejected the offer preferring continued research to management.

Honors
Thomson was the first recipient of the American Institute of Electrical Engineers AIEE (now Institute of Electrical and Electronics Engineers (IEEE)) Edison Medal, bestowed upon him in 1909 "For meritorious achievement in electrical science, engineering and arts as exemplified in his contributions thereto during the past thirty years."; Thomson was also president of the organization from 1889–90. Near the end of his life, Thomson's second wife Clarissa Hovey Thomson  is reported to have said that she had to carry a basket with her to carry all of Thomson's awards and honors.

He was elected as a member of the American Philosophical Society in 1876.

In 1889 he was decorated by the French Government for his electrical inventions, being made Chevalier et Officier de la Légion d'honneur. He received the honorary degree of A.M. from Yale (1890). Tufts College in 1892 gave him the degree of Ph.D., and in 1899 he received a D.Sc. from Harvard.

Later life
He was a founding member, as well as the second president, of the International Electrotechnical Commission.

He served as acting president of MIT from 1920–1923. Thomson, overcoming his distaste for management, accepted this role during a critical period for the university when it could not otherwise find a president.

On June 21, 1932, at age 79, Thomson was interviewed on film talking about his life and times.

Thomson died at his estate in Swampscott, Massachusetts. The Elihu Thomson House in Swampscott was designated a U.S. National Historic Landmark in 1976 and serves as Swampscott's town hall.

Patents
Thomson held more than 700 patents. Thomson used his patents to bolster his company, Thomson-Houston Company, later  General Electric.

  Electric-Arc Lamp
  Electric Lamp
  Electric-Arc Lamp
  Regulator For Dynamo-Electric Machines
  System Of Electric Distribution
  Automatic Compensator For Magnets
  System Of Electric Distribution
  System Of Electric Distribution
  Process Of Electric Soldering
  Method Of Electric Welding
  Electric-Arc Lamp
  Mode Of Making Tools
  Electric-Arc Lamp
  Electric-Arc Lamp
  Electric Switch
  Electric-Lighting System
  Lightning-Arrester
  Regulator For Electric Generators
  Mode Of Cooling Electric Motors
  Electrostatic Motor
  Electrical Welding Of Sheet Metal

Personal life
He married Mary Louise Peck (born: June 1, 1856 in New Britain, Hartford County, Connecticut) on May 1, 1884.

Children
Stuart Thomson b: August 13, 1886
Roland Davis Thomson b: June 17, 1888
Malcolm Thomson b.: August 30, 1891
Donald Thurston Thomson b.: April 10, 1893

His second wife was Clarissa Hovey Thomson.

See also
Electricity meter
Electromagnetic propulsion
Electronic oscillator
Negative resistance
Repulsion motor
Shaded-pole motor
Tesla coil
Three-phase electric power
Welding

Notes

References

Carlson, W. Bernard.  Innovation as a Social Process: Elihu Thomson and the Rise of General Electric, 1870-1900 (Cambridge: Cambridge University Press, 1991).
Haney, John L.  The Elihu Thomson Collection American Philosophical Society Yearbook 1944.
Hughes, Thomas "American Genesis" (Chicago and London: The University of Chicago Press, 2004).
Thomson, Elihu. Address by Elihu Thomson on Physics in the Proceedings of the American Association for the Advancement of Science 48th Meeting August, 1899.
Woodbury, David O.  Elihu Thomson, Beloved Scientist (Boston: Museum of Science, 1944)

External links

 
 Elihu Thomson Papers
Elihu Thomson in Open Library
Elihu Thomson recounts his childhood (June 21, 1932) - Youtube video

1853 births
1937 deaths
American electrical engineers
19th-century American inventors
20th-century American inventors
American patent holders
English emigrants to the United States
Central High School (Philadelphia) alumni
Harvard University alumni
IEEE Edison Medal recipients
John Fritz Medal recipients
Engineers from Manchester
Scientists from Philadelphia
People from Swampscott, Massachusetts
Presidents of the Massachusetts Institute of Technology
Technicolor SA
Engineers from Pennsylvania
Members of the United States National Academy of Sciences